Lithobraking is a whimsical euphemism used by spacecraft engineers to refer to a spacecraft impacting the surface of a planet or moon. The word was coined by analogy with "aerobraking," slowing a spacecraft by intersecting the atmosphere, with "lithos" ( [], "rock") substituted to indicate the spacecraft is intersecting the planet's solid lithosphere rather than merely its gaseous atmosphere. 

According to Jonathan McDowell, "Lithobraking reduces the apoapsis height to zero instantly, but with the unfortunate side effect that the spacecraft does not survive. Originally a whimsical euphemism, but increasingly a standard term."

End-of-mission lithobraking 
Lithobraking is used to refer to the result of a spacecraft crashing into the rocky surface of a body with no measures to ensure its survival, either by accident or with intent. For instance, the term has been used to describe the impact of MESSENGER into Mercury after the spacecraft ran out of fuel. More recently, the term has also been used to describe the successful completion of the Double Asteroid Redirection Test (DART), when a probe crashed into Dimorphos to test lithobraking as a method of planetary defense.

Intact lithobraking 
Successful lithobraking requires a spacecraft capable of impacting the planet or moon at high velocity, or protecting the probe with sufficient cushioning to withstand an impact with the surface undamaged. Incoming angles are made shallow enough such that the impact has the characteristic of a glancing blow, rather than a direct impact on the surface. Lithobraking can be combined with other braking techniques, where the velocity of a lander can be reduced using retrorockets or parachutes, and it can be protected from the force of impact by cushioning air bags or shock absorbers. 

In the absence of a thick atmosphere, lithobraking is difficult due to the extremely high orbital velocities of most bodies. However, the orbital velocity of small moons (for example, Phobos), asteroids, and comets can be sufficiently small for this strategy to be feasible. For example, Rosetta lander, Philae, passively landed on the comet 67P/Churyumov–Gerasimenko after separating from the orbiter, dissipating energy only through impact with the surface of the comet. The MASCOT lander from Hayabusa2 landed on asteroid 162173 Ryugu in a similar manner.

Instead of attempting to slowly dissipate the incoming velocity, it can be used to enable the probe to penetrate the surface.
This can be tried on bodies with low gravitation, such as comets and asteroids, or on planets with atmospheres (by using only small parachutes, or no parachutes at all).  Several such missions have been launched, including penetrators on the two Phobos probe landers targeted for Mars' moon Phobos and ones for Mars itself on Mars 96 and Deep Space 2, but so far none have succeeded. The cancelled LUNAR-A probe would have carried penetrators to the Moon.

Related Concepts

Kraft Ehricke had proposed the idea of a slide landing on the moon, where a spacecraft's orbit is tangent to the lunar surface, and the spacecraft skids to a stop by sliding against the regolith. Related concepts involve the spacecraft in an orbit tangent to the surface of the body in question, and "docking" with a magnetically levitated (maglev) train, and the train then slowing.  This technique requires extremely precise guidance and control, in addition to a large infrastructure, and is thus not yet a viable optionalthough it may be in the future.

In popular culture 
This usage is popular among fans of the game Kerbal Space Program, where unintentional use of lithobraking is a common gameplay experience. Occasionally however, lithobraking where the craft survives contact with the body is possible within the limits of the game's engine.

See also

Aerocapture
Aerogravity assist
Asteroid capture
Atmospheric reentry
Skip reentry

References 

Spacecraft propulsion
21st-century neologisms